Bhadradri Thermal Power Station is a proposed power plant project located near Edulla Bayyaram at Manuguru in the Indian state of Telangana.

History 
Chief Minister of Telangana Kalvakuntla Chandrashekar Rao laid down foundation stone for this project on 28-March-2015. The project started to help resolve the power crisis in Telangana. TS Govt is planning to make this plant operational within three years. Plant construction is by Bharat Heavy Electricals Limited.

MoEF has given environment clearance to the project on 15.03.2017 and BHEL has start EPC works on war footing to complete the first Unit by 2019. The first unit was synchronised on 19.09.2019, full load was achieved on 20.03.2020 and Trial run completed on 05.06.2020.

Capacity

References 

Khammam district
Coal-fired power stations in Telangana
Government of Telangana
KCR Government initiatives
Proposed infrastructure in Andhra Pradesh
Proposed power stations in India
2020 establishments in Telangana